Neotephritis quadrata is a species of tephritid or fruit flies in the genus Neotephritis of the family Tephritidae.

Distribution
Brazil, Uruguay.

References

Tephritinae
Insects described in 1933
Diptera of South America